Xu Xihan is a Chinese Paralympic swimmer. She represented China at the 2016 Summer Paralympics and she won the gold medal in the women's 50 metre butterfly S5 event.

References

External links 
 

Living people
Year of birth missing (living people)
Place of birth missing (living people)
Paralympic swimmers of China
Swimmers at the 2016 Summer Paralympics
Paralympic gold medalists for China
Medalists at the 2016 Summer Paralympics
S5-classified Paralympic swimmers
Chinese female freestyle swimmers
Chinese female butterfly swimmers
Paralympic medalists in swimming
21st-century Chinese women